Peter Christoffersen Tønder (1641-1694) was a Norwegian government official.  He served as the County Governor of Nordland county from 1691 until his death in 1694.

References

1641 births
1694 deaths
County governors of Norway
County governors of Nordland